Aerorozvidka ("aerial reconnaissance") is a team and NGO that promotes creating and implementing netcentric and robotic military capabilities for the security and defense forces of Ukraine. Aerorozvidka exemplifies the direct engagement of civil society in resisting foreign aggression against Ukraine, and specialises in aerial reconnaissance and drone warfare. It was founded in May 2014 by a team which included Ukrainian battalion commander Natan Chazin. Its founder, Volodymyr Kochetkov-Sukach, was an investment banker who was killed in Russo-Ukrainian War in 2015.

Foundation 
Aerorozvidka began as a group of volunteer drone and IT enthusiasts, which eventually evolved later into a military unit. It has been termed a "war startup" by the Atlantic Council.

When the occupation of Crimea by Russia started in 2014, Natan Khazin, the leader of the "Jewish Regiment" of the Euromaidan and a soldier of the first "Azov" formation, began to look for opportunities for the technical armament of the Ukrainian army. After an unsuccessful trip to Israel, where he was refused help, he turned to his friend from Maidan for help. This friend was making panoramic shots from a DJI Phantom drone. The videoclip "Ukraine through the eyes of a drone", produced with his contribution, has gained over a million views on YouTube. It was from this drone, which he has gifted to the volunteers, Aerorozvidka began.

Volodymyr Kochetkov-Sukach took this drone and went to the "Aidar" battalion, where it received a positive feedback. Later Yaroslav Honchar undertook to adapt the device for action in combat conditions, which he did in cooperation with the Krok computer academy. As a result, the flight range of Ukrainian drones increased from 300 meters to 3 kilometers (1000 feet to 2 miles). Aircraft modeling clubs, individual amateurs and commercial organizations also contributed into this. The devices were continuously improved and were used in the Armed Forces of Ukraine and in volunteer battalions.

Status and cooperation 
At the beginning of its activity, the Aerorozvidka volunteer group already had cooperated with the Armed Forces, the Internal Troops and the National Guard of Ukraine as well as with the State Border Guard Service of Ukraine. Later, the Aerorozvidka community members joined intelligence units in groups.

In December 2015, members of Aerorozvidka joined the Armed Forces of Ukraine in the form of military unit A2724 called the Center for the Implementation and Support of Automated Operational (Combat) Control Systems. The unit was formed from the Aerorozvidka group volunteers, which worked at that time in separate intelligence units 74 and 131. The new unit joined the Communications and Cyber Security Forces of the Armed Forces of Ukraine. However, in 2020, on the initiative of the General Staff of the Ukrainian Armed Forces, the Ministry of Defense of Ukraine liquidated this military unit. In the NATO system, the unit is classified as C4ISR (command, control, communications, IT (computers), intelligence, surveillance, instrumental intelligence).

In July 2020, the volunteer group members registered the NGO "Aerorozvidka" in Ukraine.

In March 2021, a reorganization takes place, after which the A2724 military unit is restored in the structure of the Ministry of Defense. One part of the unit, which worked in the direction of video surveillance, comes under the command of the Joint Forces Command of the Armed Forces of Ukraine. Later, by the end of 2021, the Center for Innovations and Defense Technologies is also separated (from 2022 it appears in official sources under the name Center for Innovations and Development of Defense Technologies). The other part of the former military unit A2724 becomes the scientific staff of the Military Institute of Telecommunications and Information Technologies.

Current activities 
As of 2022, the activities of Aerorozvidka included:
 development, testing and implementation of automated control tools, primarily the Delta situational awareness system;
 development, testing, implementation and application of various sensors for the situational awareness system, in particular video surveillance;
 designing and operation of multirotor unmanned aerial vehicles;
 promoting the reforms of the Armed Forces of Ukraine, primarily regarding the implementation of the C4ISR system;
 cooperation with state authorities on the development of capabilities of the security and defense forces of Ukraine for the integration of Aerorozvidka veterans into civilian life;
 implementation of other scientific and technical projects and application of military experience in civilian spheres (e.g., in the Chernobyl Exclusion Zone; participation in international events: CWIX, Sea Breeze, Rapid Trident).

Drones 
In August 2014, Volodymyr Kochetkov-Sukach reported that Aerorozvidka already produces alternative unmanned aerial vehicles for the needs of Ukrainian military in ATO zone, taking standard copters available in stores as a basis, modernizing them. After that, drones are suitable for tactical reconnaissance. The devices worked on the front lines in five detachments and showed good results: they transmitted data, photos with geotags at a distance of up to 2 km. This is enough for the commander to make a decision to send the detachment.

In 2016, Aerorozvidka launched a program to develop the first prototypes of unmanned aerial vehicles. In 2019 the model was fully tested in combat on the east of Ukraine. By 24 February 2022, 50 sets of R18 octocopters, which have eight motors for greater reliability, have been manufactured. Copters are capable of vertical take-off and landing, have range of 5 km (3 miles), can stay in the air for about 40 minutes and carry 5 kg (11 lbs) of payload. Ukrainian and imported components are used for construction. Drones were originally developed to deliver medicine and food, however the Russian invasion on 24 February 2022 changed the way they are used. Those drones are now often used as bombers, with Soviet cumulative anti-tank grenades RKG-3 or RKG-1600 are used as projectiles. The R18 drone can carry three of such grenades.

Apart from that, Aerorozvidka accumulates third-party drones, which combat units use for reconnaissance and adjusting artillery fire. These include, in particular, commercial DJI and Autel drones, which usually come as volunteer aid. PD-1, Leleka-100 and other drones are also purchased for use in the warfare.

Aerorozvidka claims that as of 2022, the use of drones in the warfare became commonplace. However, they are a consumable material, just like cartridges, because they can be destroyed. At the same time, the difference in cost between Aerorozvidka drones and the rival equipment destroyed by them, is very large. Also, destroying rival equipment by those drones saves the lives of civilians and Ukrainian servicemen.

Drones often do not last for long before they are shot down mid-flight, however they still provide tactical importance during the day or two of their operational life nonetheless. Consumer drones with a retail value of approximately $1,000 are already suitable for a range of tasks such as carrying explosives, observing military units, and targeting artillery. The former hobbyist drone pilots also rebuild damaged drones, perform modifications to make them easier to fly, and train soldiers to fly them. As some sources do not explicitly refer to Aerorozvidka, more similar groups of drone enthusiasts may be active in Ukraine.

The Russian invasion in 2022 

During the 2022 Russian invasion of Ukraine, pilot squads have been targeting Russian forces at night while immobile. On February 24, 2022, a large column of Russian military equipment moved toward Kyiv from Belarus along the right bank of the Dnieper river. On that day, the Ukrainian military units met the enemy near the town of Hostomel. In order to prevent the encirclement of the Ukrainian capital, the Ukrainian military units, supported by Aerorozvidka drones, attacked Russian troops from the direction of the town of Malyn. After the first few hits, Russian troops dispersed their large columns into groups of 5 to 10 vehicles. Ukrainian has also successfully destroyed the enemy’s military depots and cut the supply chains. The unit's commander, Lt Col Yaroslav Honchar, is an ex-soldier turned IT marketing consultant. He returned to the army after the first Russian invasion of Ukraine in 2014.

With the help of drones and Starlink terminals, Ukrainian forces have stopped a long Russian military convoy. The level of coordination, provided with the help of drones and Starlink terminals enabled the Ukrainian military to stop the Russian advance. Activists of Aerorozvidka say that stable high-speed connection was only possible thanks to Starlink terminals. Later the Ukrainian military units started working with octocopters R18, as well as other drones and Starlink terminals in other areas of the combat zone. Their communication is organized through the system of situational awareness "Delta".

Interesting facts 
 The term "aerial reconnaissance" in Ukrainian given name for Aerorozvidka has been introduced by the founders of the organization Yaroslav Honchar, Volodymyr Kochetkov-Sukach, and Natan Khazin. Prior to that Ukraine used the term "aerial photography".
 On February 9, 2015, a powerful explosion happened in Donetsk. Representatives of Aerorozvidka claimed they had adjusted that strike.

References

External links 
 

2014 establishments in Ukraine
Non-governmental organizations
Military intelligence
Information technology organizations based in Ukraine
Army units and formations of Ukraine
Volunteer military formations of Ukraine
Military units and formations of the Russo-Ukrainian War